Willow Airport  is a state-owned, public-use airport located one nautical mile (1.85 km) northwest of the central business district of Willow, in the Matanuska-Susitna Borough of the U.S. state of Alaska. It is located across the road from Willow Lake and the Willow Seaplane Base .

As per Federal Aviation Administration records, Willow Airport had 2,703 passenger boardings (enplanements) in calendar year 2008, an increase of 33% from the 2,025 enplanements in 2007. Willow Airport is included in the FAA's National Plan of Integrated Airport Systems (2009-2013), which categorizes it as a general aviation facility.

Although most U.S. airports use the same three-letter location identifier for the FAA and IATA, Willow Airport is assigned UUO by the FAA and WOW by the IATA.

Facilities and aircraft 
It has one runway designated 13/31 with a gravel surface measuring 4,400 by 75 feet (1,341 x 23 m). The airport is unattended.

For the 12-month period ending December 31, 2005, the airport had 7,700 aircraft operations, an average of 21 per day: 78% general aviation, 19% air taxi and 3% military. At that time there were 21 aircraft based at this airport: 90% single-engine, 5% multi-engine and 5% helicopter.

Remarks:
 Runway 13 non-standard markings; threshold marked with flexible reflective markers & cones.
 Runway 31 non-standard markings; displaced threshold marked with reflective markers & cones.
 Runway 31 approach slope 20:1 to displaced threshold.
 Credit card self serve fuel available 24 hours.
 Activate rotating beacon - CTAF.
 Activate MIRL runway 13/31 - CTAF.
 Runway condition not monitored; recommend visual inspection prior to using.
 Float planes on Willow Lake across road.
 When available weather reports hourly only.

References

External links 
 

Airports in Matanuska-Susitna Borough, Alaska